HMS Furious was a 16 gun steam powered paddle wheel frigate of the Royal Navy built at Portsmouth Dockyard and launched on 26 August 1850. She was built at a cost of £64,794, of which her machinery cost £24,577.

On 29 October 1853, Furious struck a sunken rock in the Dardanelles  from Gallipoli, Ottoman Empire and was damaged. On 15 April 1854, she sank the corvette  at Odessa after coming under fire from shore-based artillery.

Furious was sent with 14 gunboats as reinforcements to the China squadron in 1857.
 
She became a coal hulk at Portsmouth in March 1867 and was sold for breaking up in 1884 to Castle, of Charlton.

References

Lyon, David and Winfield, Rif, The Sail and Steam Navy List, All the Ships of the Royal Navy 1815–1889, pub Chatham, 2004, 

Frigates of the Royal Navy
Coal hulks
1850 ships
Maritime incidents in October 1853